(1004–1077), also known as , was a noble and a scholar of ancient Japan. He was also the father of Toba Sōjō, an important painter.

Takakuni was also mentioned as Dainagon of Uji in "gleanings from Uji Dainagon Monogatari" - a collection of Japanese tales written around the beginning of the 13th century, which no longer exists.

See also 

 Minamoto clan
 Uji Shūi Monogatari

References 
Kōjien, 6th edition.

1004 births
1077 deaths
Minamoto clan